This is the discography of American singer-songwriter Billy Joel. He released 13 studio albums, six live albums, 18 compilation albums, 10 video albums, 61 singles, three promotional singles and 45 music videos. Throughout his career, he has sold over 150 million records worldwide, making him one of the best-selling music artists in history. According to Recording Industry Association of America, Joel has sold 85 million certified albums in the United States, making him the 4th best-selling solo artist of all time (behind Garth Brooks, Elvis Presley & Michael Jackson). Billboard ranked him as the 9th Greatest male soloist of all time (19th overall).

His compilation album Greatest Hits – Volume I & Volume II is the 2nd best-selling album by a solo artist in RIAA history, achieving 23× Platinum certification in the US (behind Thriller by Michael Jackson). The Stranger remains his best-selling studio album release, achieving 10× Platinum (Diamond status) in the US as well.

Albums

Studio albums

Live albums

Compilation albums

Video albums

Singles

Other singles:

 "She's Got a Way" B-side "Everybody Loves You Now/You Can Make Me Free" (1971–72)
 "You Can Make Me Free" B-side "You Look So Good to Me" Philips 6078 005
 "Tomorrow Is Today" B-side "Everybody Loves You Now" (1972) FPS-0906
 "Nocturne" B-side "Tomorrow Is Today" (Dutch promo single) (1972)
 "Why Judy Why" B-side "Nocturne" (Australian-only single) (1972)
 "Root Beer Rag" B-side "Roberta" (Dutch promo single) (1975)
 "If I Only Had the Words (To Tell You)" B-side "Stop in Nevada" (UK promo single) (1975)
 "I've Loved These Days" B-side "Say Goodbye to Hollywood" (US-only single) (1976)
 "Everybody Has a Dream" B-side "Vienna" (Dutch-only single) (1978)
 "Nobody Knows But Me" B-side of "Santa Claus Is Coming to Town" by Bruce Springsteen (US promo single) CBS PRO151, from In Harmony 2 LP (1981)
 "C'était toi (You Were the One)" B-side "Close To The Borderline" (French-only single) (1980)
 "Los Angelenos" (live) B-side "She's Got a Way" (live) (Japanese-only single) (1981) Columbia 3-10562
 "She's Right on Time" B-side "A Room of Our Own" (Dutch promo single) (1983)
 "Temptation" B-side "The Night is still Young" (Australian single) (1987)
 "The Times They Are A-Changin'" (live) B-side (live) [tracks recorded in the USSR] released in USA, Canada, Australia (1987)
 "Shout" live at Yankee Stadium (Australian & Austrian single) (1990) with 4 other tracks live at Yankee Stadium on CD/Cassette
 "Storm Front" live at Yankee Stadium (Australian-only single) (1991) Bside: LP version of "Storm Front"
 "When You Wish Upon a Star" (Japanese promo single) (1991)
 "Shades of Grey" (US promo single) (1993)

Other charted or certified songs

Guest appearances and other contributions

Music videos

Notes

A  Cold Spring Harbor originally peaked at number 202 on the Billboard Bubbling Under the Top LP's chart in 1972. The album was re-issued by Columbia in December 1983. All chart positions listed for Cold Spring Harbor are for its 1983 re-issue.
B  Piano Man entered the UK Albums Chart following a 1984 re-issue. It entered the Japanese Oricon Albums Chart following a 2004 re-issue.
C  Turnstiles entered the Japanese Oricon Albums Chart following a 2004 re-issue.
D  Greatest Hits Volume I and II originally peaked at number 18 on the Norwegian Albums Chart before peaking at number 1 in 1994.
E  The Ultimate Collection originally peaked at number 21 on the Japanese Oricon Albums Chart before peaking at number 19 in 2007.
F  The Essential Billy Joel entered the Australian ARIA Albums Chart and the RIANZ Albums Chart following a 2008 reissue entitled The Essential 3.0.
G  Piano Man: The Very Best of Billy Joel originally peaked at number 40 on the UK Albums Chart before peaking at number 7 in 2010.
H  "Piano Man" first entered the UK Singles Chart in 2008 and peaked at number 136.
I  "She's Always a Woman" peaked at number 53 on the UK Singles Chart in 1986 following a double A-side single re-release with "Just the Way You Are". It reentered the chart in 2010 and reached a new peak of 29.
J   In the United Kingdom, "Goodnight Saigon" and "Leave a Tender Moment Alone" were released as a double A-side single.

References

External links
 Official website
 
 
 

Rock music discographies
Discographies of American artists
Discography